Alexander Volkov was the defending champion, but lost in second round to Andrei Cherkasov.

Omar Camporese won the title by defeating Goran Ivanišević 3–6, 6–3, 6–4 in the final.

Seeds

Draw

Finals

Top half

Bottom half

References

External links
 Official results archive (ATP)
 Official results archive (ITF)

Milan Indoor
1992 ATP Tour
Milan